て, in hiragana, or テ in katakana, is one of the Japanese kana, each of which represents one mora.  Both represent .

Stroke order

Other communicative representations

 Full Braille representation

 Computer encodings

See also

 Te form of Japanese verb

References 

Specific kana